Tochiizumi Takayuki (born 26 November 1959 as Takayuki Nakayama) is a former sumo wrestler from Izumisano, Osaka, Japan. He made his professional debut in January 1975, but never reached the top division. His highest rank was jūryō 3. He left the sumo world upon retirement from active competition in March 1990.

Career record

See also
Glossary of sumo terms
List of past sumo wrestlers
List of sumo tournament second division champions

References

1959 births
Living people
Japanese sumo wrestlers
Sumo people from Osaka Prefecture
People from Osaka Prefecture
People from Izumisano